Andreas Stöberl (ca. 1464  in Pleiskirchen near Altötting – September 3, 1515 in Vienna), better known by his latinised name Andreas Stiborius (Boius), was a German humanist astronomer, mathematician, and theologian working mainly at the University of Vienna.

Life 

Stöberl studied from 1479 on at the University of Ingolstadt, where he became a magister in 1484, and subsequently a member of the Faculty of Arts.
At Ingolstadt, he met and became a friend of Conrad Celtis, an eminent advocate of humanism who lectured there between 1492 and 1497.  
When Celtis moved to Vienna in 1497, Stöberl followed his mentor.
Stiborius was a member of the Sodalitas Litterarum Danubiana, a circle of humanists founded by Celtis.
In 1502 he became one of two professors for mathematics (the other was Johannes Stabius, his friend from Ingolstadt) at the Collegium poetarum et mathematicorum, founded on Celtis' initiative by emperor Maximilian I the year before, as a part of the University of Vienna. At the Collegium, he taught courses in astronomy and astrology, as he did later at the University, where he got a chair at the Collegium ducale in 1503.
Stiborius was a gifted teacher and well-liked by his students.
In 1507 or 1508 he became a canon at St. Stephen's, and until his death in 1515 in Vienna he was also parish priest in Stockerau, where he was buried.

Works 

At Vienna, Stiborius worked with Georg Tannstetter, who came to Vienna from Ingolstadt in Autumn 1502.
Together they became the most prominent exponents of the "Second Viennese School of Mathematics" (the first having been the circle around Johann von Gmunden, Georg von Peuerbach, and Regiomontanus).
Tannstetter in his Viri Mathematici names both Stabius and Stiborius as his teachers.

As editor, Stiborius published an edition of Robert Grosseteste's Libellus Linconiensis de Phisicis lineis, angulis et figuris, per quas omnes acciones naturales complentur in 1503.

For Tannstetter's edition Tabulae Eclypsium..., which was published in 1514 and contained tables of eclipses of Georg von Peuerbach and the primi mobilis tables of Regiomontanus, Stiborius wrote two prefaces.

In preparation of the 10th session of the 5th council of the Lateran, Pope Leo X requested in October 1514 from various rulers to have their scientists offer proposals on the calendar reform. Emperor Maximilian gave the task to Stiborius and Tannstetter in Vienna, and to Johannes Stöffler at Tübingen. Stiborius and Tannstetter proposed to omit one leap year every 134 years, and to drop the 19-year metonic cycle used by the Church to calculate the Easter date. Instead of the metonic cycle, they proposed to simply use the true astronomic calculation for the full moon dates to determine Paschal Full Moon. Furthermore, they pointed out that the true astronomic March equinox and full moons, on which the whole calculation of the Easter date and thus other Church holidays was based, would occur at different times, sometimes even different dates in places at different longitudes around the globe, leading to Church holidays falling on different days in different places. They recommended to use universally the equinox at the Meridian of Jerusalem or Rome.
Tanstetter and Stiborius's calendar reform proposal was published as Super requisitione sanctissimi Leonis Papae X. et divi Maximiliani Imp. p.f. Aug. De Romani Calendarii correctione Consilium in Florentissimo studio Viennensi Anustriae conscriptum et aeditum ca. 1515 by the printer Johannes Singriener in Vienna.
As it turned out, the whole topic of the calendar reform was not even discussed at the fifth Lateran Council.

Tannstetter gives in his Viri Mathematici a list of books in Stiborius's library, and also a list of works written by the latter himself. He mentions a five-volume Opus Umbrarum ("Work of Shadows"), in which Stiborius treated various astronomical and mathematical topics such as cartographic projections, the theory and use of the astrolabe including the saphea, the construction of sundials, and others. The work was the basis of his lectures in Vienna; it appears never to have been published though. A partial copy made in 1500 of these lecture notes has survived.

Legacy 

The lunar crater Stiborius is named after him.

Footnotes

References

Literature 

Schöner, Christoph: Mathematik und Astronomie an der Universität Ingolstadt im 15. und 16. Jahrhundert, Ludovico Maximilianea. Forschungen; Vol. 13, Berlin : Duncker und Humblot, 1994. . In German.

1464 births
1515 deaths
Austrian astronomers
Austrian mathematicians
Austrian Renaissance humanists
15th-century German astronomers
16th-century German astronomers
15th-century German mathematicians
16th-century German mathematicians